This is a list of gay characters in fiction, i.e. characters that either self-identify as gay or have been identified by outside parties to be gay, becoming part of gay media. Listed characters are either recurring characters, cameos, guest stars, or one-off characters, some of which may be gay icons. This page does not include gay characters in anime, Western animation, feature films or television.

For fictional characters in other parts of the LGBTQ community, see the lists of trans, bisexual, lesbian, non-binary, pansexual, asexual, and intersex characters.

The names are organized alphabetically by surname (i.e. last name), or by single name if the character does not have a surname. If more than two characters are in one entry, the last name of the first character is used.

Graphic novels

Literature

Video games

Webcomics

See also

 Gay pulp fiction 
 Gay literature 
 Gay village
 Gay bashing
 List of films with LGBT characters
 List of made-for-television films with LGBT characters
 List of lesbian, gay, bisexual or transgender-related films
 LGBT themes in comics
 List of animated series with LGBTQ characters
 List of polyamorous characters in fiction
 List of LGBT-themed speculative fiction
 List of LGBT characters in soap operas
 List of LGBT-related films
 Lists of LGBT figures in fiction and myth

References

Notes

External links
About Gay Movies

Gay masculinity
 
Gay
Homosexuality
Same-sex sexuality